Yisma Nigus (or Yisma Negus) is an Ethiopian historical site where the Treaty of Wuchale was signed by Menelik II (King of Shewa, later Emperor of Ethiopia) and Count Pietro Antonelli of Italy on 2 May 1889. Disputes over the treaty would later on lead to the First Italo-Ethiopian War.

It is located in South Wollo, Ethiopia, about 6 km away from a town of Wuchale.

References

Notes 

Amhara Region